Maciste the Athlete (Italian:Maciste atleta) is a 1918 Italian silent film directed by Vincenzo Denizot and Giovanni Pastrone and starring Bartolomeo Pagano. It is part of the Maciste series.

Cast
 Bartolomeo Pagano as Maciste  
 Italia Almirante-Manzini 
 Ruggero Capodaglio 
 Giulio Andreotti

References

Bibliography
 Jacqueline Reich. The Maciste Films of Italian Silent Cinema. Indiana University Press, 2015.

External links

1918 films
1910s Italian-language films
Films directed by Giovanni Pastrone
Italian silent feature films
Maciste films
Italian black-and-white films
Silent adventure films